The 2016–17 Washington State Cougars men's basketball team represented Washington State University during the 2016–17 NCAA Division I men's basketball season. The team was led by third-year head coach Ernie Kent. The Cougars played their home games at the Beasley Coliseum in Pullman, Washington as members in the Pac-12 Conference. They finished the season 13–18, 6–12 in Pac-12 play to finish in a tie for ninth place. They lost to Colorado in the first round of the Pac-12 tournament.

Previous season
The Cougars finished the 2015–16 season 9–22, 1–17 in Pac-12 play to finish in last place in the conference. The Cougars lost in the first round of the Pac-12 tournament to Colorado.

Off-season

Departures

Incoming transfers

2016 recruiting class

Roster

Schedule and results

|-
!colspan=9 style=| Exhibition

|-
!colspan=9 style=| Non-conference regular season

|-
!colspan=9 style=| Pac-12 regular season

|-
!colspan=9 style=| Pac-12 Tournament

References

Washington State Cougars men's basketball seasons
Washington State
Washington State
Washington State